Alexandre Tremblay (born March 22, 1979) is a Canadian professional ice hockey player who is currently playing with the Thetford Assurancia in the Ligue Nord-Américaine de Hockey (LNAH).

Playing career
He got promoted to National League A with EHC Biel in 2008  and captained Lausanne HC in the National League B, with whom he played from 2008 to 2011, reaching the promotion-relegation game twice against his former team Biel. Both events were heartbreaking defeats for LHC and Tremblay. He left Lausanne for EHC Visp in 2011  after a very disappointing season that saw LHC lose in the National League B final to Visp 4-0. He joined the GCK Lions in December 2012. He had brief stints in National League A with Fribourg-Gottéron, Genève-Servette and ZSC Lions, without being able to establish himself in the elite Swiss league.

Career statistics

Awards and honours

References

External links

1979 births
Living people
Canadian ice hockey left wingers
EHC Basel players
EHC Biel players
EHC Visp players
French Quebecers
Genève-Servette HC players
GCK Lions players
HC Fribourg-Gottéron players
HC La Chaux-de-Fonds players
JYP Jyväskylä players
Laval Titan Collège Français players
Lausanne HC players
Quebec RadioX players
Rimouski Océanic players
Shawinigan Cataractes players
Syracuse Crunch players
Thetford Assurancia players
ZSC Lions players
Canadian expatriate ice hockey players in Finland
Canadian expatriate ice hockey players in Switzerland